Muthukku Muthaaga is a 2011 Indian Tamil family drama film written, produced, and directed by Rasu Madhuravan. It stars Vikranth, Natraj, Harish, Oviya, Monica, Prakash, Veerasamar, Ilavarasu, and Saranya Ponvannan. The film is a very sad story revolving around the relationship between parents and their children. The music was composed by Kavi Periyathambi, while cinematography was done by U. K. Senthil Kumar. The film released on 18 March 2011 and met with positive response from the audience and become a commercial success in B&C centres.

Plot
The film revolves around an old couple: Thavasi (Ilavarasu) and Pechi (Saranya Ponvannan). They have five sons: Bose (Vikranth), Raman (Natraj), Selvam (Arish), Lakshmanan (Prakash), and Pandi (Veerasamar). Thavasi and Pechi strive hard with their meager earnings to bring up their sons so that most of their needs are met. Bose falls in love with Annamayil (Monica), a nurse. Without knowing this, Thavasi and Pechi arrange Bose's wedding with their relative, for which Bose agrees as he does not want to make his parents feel bad. Annamayil also understands Bose's situation and accepts his decision. A few of the couple's sons are married, and trouble erupts in their family due to the daughters-in-law, who do not prefer a joint family and keep insisting on partitioning properties and leading a nuclear family. Thavasi, although uninterested in a nuclear family, agrees for the well-being of his sons. Also, Thavasi and Pechi come to know about Bose's sacrificed love towards Annamayil, which makes them more worried as Bose's wife is not kind towards him. Pechi gets sick, and the daughters-in-law start considering her and Thavasi as burdens. Thavasi and Pechi understand this and decide to end their lives. In the end, both of them commit suicide.

Cast

 Vikranth as Bose
 Natraj as Raman
 Harish as Selvam
 Ilavarasu as Thavasi
 Saranya Ponvannan as Pechi
 Prakash as Lakshmanan
 Veerasamar as Pandi
 Oviya as Swetha
 Monica as Annamayil
 Singampuli as Suruttu
 Varshini as Vasanthi
 Sujibala as Raasathi
 Gayathri Yuvaraj as Gayathri
 Janaki as Panchavarnam
 Jayalakshmi as Virumayi
 Raj Kapoor as Thavasi's relative

Soundtrack
The soundtrack was composed by Kavi Periyathambi, and lyrics were written by Na. Muthukumar and Nandalala.
"Enna Panni Tholacha" -Singer(s): Vijay Yesudas, Chinmayi
"Man Vaasam Veesum" (F) - Singer(s): Harini
"Oru Sudidhar Poo" - Singer(s): Haricharan, Dr. Lavanya
"Man Vaasam Veesum" (M) - Singer(s): Madhu Balakrishnan
"Ennanra Nee Ennanra" - Singer(s): Mukesh Mohamed, Krishna Beura, Roshini
"Vanakkam" - Singer(s): Sriram, Mukesh Mohamed, Janani
"Kaathadicha Noagumunnu" - Singer(s): Krishna Raj

References

2011 films
2011 drama films
2010s Tamil-language films
Indian drama films
Films directed by Rasu Madhuravan